{{Speciesbox
| image = Channa marulius (Mekong) 2347.jpg
| image_caption = 
| taxon = Channa auroflammea
| authority = Adamson, Britz & Lieng, 2019<ref>{{Cite web|url=https://www.gbif.org/species/156266743|title=Channa auroflammea|website=www.gbif.org}}</ref>
}}Channa auroflammea is a species of snakehead, a fish of the family Channidae. Its range includes Mekong River. It was previously lumped with C. marulius, C. cf. marulius, or C. aff. marulius'', but can be distinguished within the group by colour pattern, other morphological characteristics, and genetic information.

References

auroflammea
Fish of Southeast Asia
Taxa named by Ralf Britz
Fish described in 2019